The 10th parallel north is a circle of latitude that is 10 degrees north of the Earth's equatorial plane. It crosses Africa, the Indian Ocean, the Indian Subcontinent, Southeast Asia, the Pacific Ocean, Central America, South America and the Atlantic Ocean.

At this latitude the sun is visible for 12 hours, 43 minutes during the summer solstice and 11 hours, 33 minutes during the winter solstice.

On 21 June, the maximum altitude of the sun is 103.44 degrees and 56.56 degrees on 21 December.

A section of the border between Guinea and Sierra Leone is defined by the parallel.

The Ten Degree Channel in the Indian Ocean is named after the parallel.

Around the world
Starting at the Prime Meridian and heading eastwards, the parallel 10° north passes through:

{| class="wikitable plainrowheaders"
! scope="col" width="115" | Co-ordinates
! scope="col" | Country, territory or sea
! scope="col" | Notes
|-
| 
! scope="row" | 
|
|-
| 
! scope="row" | 
|
|-
| 
! scope="row" | 
|
|-
| 
! scope="row" | 
|
|-
| 
! scope="row" | 
| 
|-
| 
! scope="row" | 
|
|-
| 
! scope="row" | 
| 
|-
| 
! scope="row" | 
|
|-
| 
! scope="row" | 
|
|-
| 
! scope="row" | 
|
|-
| 
! scope="row" | 
|
|-
| 
! scope="row" | 
|
|-
| 
! scope="row" | Abyei
|-
| 
! scope="row" | 
|
|-
| 
! scope="row" | 
|
|-
| 
! scope="row" | 
|
|-
| 
! scope="row" | 
|
|-
| 
! scope="row" | 
|
|-
| 
! scope="row" | 
|
|-
| 
! scope="row" | 
| Passing through Somaliland
|-valign="top"
| style="background:#b0e0e6;" | 
! scope="row" style="background:#b0e0e6;" | Indian Ocean
| style="background:#b0e0e6;" | Arabian Sea Passing just south of the island of Kalpeni,  Laccadive Sea
|-valign="top"
| 
! scope="row" | 
| Kerala — passing through Kochi Tamil Nadu
|-valign="top"
| style="background:#b0e0e6;" | 
! scope="row" style="background:#b0e0e6;" | Indian Ocean
| style="background:#b0e0e6;" | Bay of Bengal Ten Degree Channel (between the Andaman and Nicobar Islands) Andaman Sea
|-
| 
! scope="row" |  (Burma)
| Island of Zadetkyi Kyun in the Mergui Archipelago
|-
| style="background:#b0e0e6;" | 
! scope="row" style="background:#b0e0e6;" | Indian Ocean
| style="background:#b0e0e6;" | Andaman Sea
|-
| 
! scope="row" |  (Burma)
| The southernmost tip of the Burmese mainland
|-
| 
! scope="row" | 
| Ranong and Chumphon provinces
|-valign="top"
| style="background:#b0e0e6;" | 
! scope="row" style="background:#b0e0e6;" | Gulf of Thailand
| style="background:#b0e0e6;" | Passing just south of the island of Ko Tao,  Passing just south of the island of Phú Quốc, 
|-
| 
! scope="row" | 
|
|-
| style="background:#b0e0e6;" | 
! scope="row" style="background:#b0e0e6;" | South China Sea
| style="background:#b0e0e6;" | Passing through the disputed Spratly Islands
|-
| 
! scope="row" | 
| Island of Palawan
|-
| style="background:#b0e0e6;" | 
! scope="row" style="background:#b0e0e6;" | Sulu Sea
| style="background:#b0e0e6;" |
|-
| 
! scope="row" | 
| Island of Negros
|-
| style="background:#b0e0e6;" | 
! scope="row" style="background:#b0e0e6;" | Tañon Strait
| style="background:#b0e0e6;" |
|-
| 
! scope="row" | 
| Island of Cebu
|-
| style="background:#b0e0e6;" | 
! scope="row" style="background:#b0e0e6;" | Cebu Strait
| style="background:#b0e0e6;" |
|-
| 
! scope="row" | 
| Island of Bohol
|-
| style="background:#b0e0e6;" | 
! scope="row" style="background:#b0e0e6;" | Bohol Sea
| style="background:#b0e0e6;" | Passing just south of the island of Leyte, 
|-
| 
! scope="row" | 
| Island of Panaon
|-
| style="background:#b0e0e6;" | 
! scope="row" style="background:#b0e0e6;" | Surigao Strait
| style="background:#b0e0e6;" |
|-
| 
! scope="row" | 
| Islands of Sibanac and Dinagat
|-
| style="background:#b0e0e6;" | 
! scope="row" style="background:#b0e0e6;" | Dinagat Sound
| style="background:#b0e0e6;" |
|-
| 
! scope="row" | 
| Island of Siargao
|-
| style="background:#b0e0e6;" | 
! scope="row" style="background:#b0e0e6;" | Pacific Ocean
| style="background:#b0e0e6;" |
|-
| 
! scope="row" | 
| Passing through Ulithi Atoll
|-valign="top"
| style="background:#b0e0e6;" | 
! scope="row" style="background:#b0e0e6;" | Pacific Ocean
| style="background:#b0e0e6;" | Passing just north of Ujelang Atoll,  Passing just south of Wotho Atoll, 
|-
| 
! scope="row" | 
| Passing through Likiep Atoll
|-
| style="background:#b0e0e6;" | 
! scope="row" style="background:#b0e0e6;" | Pacific Ocean
| style="background:#b0e0e6;" |
|-valign="top"
| 
! scope="row" | 
| Passing through the Gulf of Nicoya Passing just north of San José 
|-
| style="background:#b0e0e6;" | 
! scope="row" style="background:#b0e0e6;" | Caribbean Sea
| style="background:#b0e0e6;" |
|-
| 
! scope="row" | 
|
|-
| 
! scope="row" | 
| Passing through Lake Maracaibo
|-
| style="background:#b0e0e6;" | 
! scope="row" style="background:#b0e0e6;" | Atlantic Ocean
| style="background:#b0e0e6;" | Passing just south of the island of Trinidad, 
|-
| 
! scope="row" | 
|
|-
| 
! scope="row" |  /  border
|
|-
| 
! scope="row" | 
|
|-
| 
! scope="row" | 
|
|-
| 
! scope="row" | 
|
|-
| 
! scope="row" | 
|
|}

Popular culture
In the end of part two of the Spanish television heist crime drama series La casa de papel, a point near Palawan island, Philippines, with the coordinates of 10th parallel north and 118,5º, was the meeting point of El Professor and Raquel one year after the heist.

See also
9th parallel north
11th parallel north

References

n10
Guinea–Sierra Leone border